Shehzad Malik (born 8 April 1978) is a Pakistani first-class cricketer who played for Sialkot cricket team.

References

External links
 

1978 births
Living people
Pakistani cricketers
Sialkot cricketers
Khan Research Laboratories cricketers
Pakistan Telecommunication Company Limited cricketers
Cricketers from Sialkot
Gujranwala cricketers